Partick Thistle Football Club are a professional football club from Glasgow, Scotland. Despite their name, the club are based at Firhill Stadium in the Maryhill area of the city, and have not played in Partick since 1908. The club have been members of the Scottish Professional Football League (SPFL) since its formation in 2013, having previously been members of the Scottish Football League. In the 2020–21 season, Thistle won Scottish League One, the third tier of the SPFL structure, and returned to the Scottish Championship, having been relegated from there in 2019–20.

Since 1936, Thistle have played in their distinctive red-and-yellow jerseys of varying designs, with hoops, stripes and predominantly yellow tops with red trims having been used, although in 2009 a centenary kit was launched in the original navy-blue style to commemorate 100 years at Firhill. Since 1908 the club have won the Scottish Second Division (third tier, now Scottish League One) twice and the Scottish First Division (second tier, now the Scottish Championship) six times, most recently in 2013. Thistle have won the Scottish Cup and the Scottish League Cup in 1921 and 1971 respectively.

Thistle are currently managed by former player Kris Doolan, who spent the majority of his professional career at the club. In 2013, they became inaugural members of the newly-formed Scottish Premiership under the management of Alan Archibald, and remained there for five consecutive seasons. During this period, Thistle secured major investment and, in 2017, finished in the top six of Scottish football for the first time in over three decades.

History

Formation and early years
 Partick Thistle Football Club was formed in 1876 in the burgh of Partick, which was at that time administratively independent of Glasgow (Partick was not subsumed into Glasgow until 1912). The club's first recorded match (and victory) took place in February against a local junior team, named Valencia. The location of this match, and thereby Thistle's first home ground, was recorded as 'Overnewton Park', which is thought to have been located next to Overnewton Road, just south of Kelvingrove Park. Having established themselves as the most popular team locally ahead of the likes of Partick F.C., in 1891 Partick Thistle joined the Scottish Football Alliance, one of several competitions set up immediately after the formation of the Scottish Football League in 1890. The club won the Second Division championship in 1897 and were elected to the First Division. The following season they were re-elected after finishing in eighth place. In 1900 they were elected back to the top level, having finished as Second Division champions again, but were relegated the following season and then promoted in second place in 1902. This would be the last time Thistle changed their division for almost 70 years. Since joining the Scottish professional leagues in 1893, Thistle had been an unpredictable side, spending four years in the First Division and five in the Second, winning promotion three times. It was during the 1902–03 Scottish Division One season that Thistle set their highest finish in the Scottish league structure, finishing 8th in the table with 19 points. In the following 33 years, they moved from home to home, using parks at Kelvingrove, Jordanvale, Muirpark, Inchview among others. In 1897 they moved to Meadowside, where they played until 1908. After being homeless for over a season, they moved to their present home, Firhill Stadium, in the Maryhill district of Glasgow. They played their first home match at Firhill, on 18 September 1909, in a 3–1 victory against Dumbarton Harp.

Cup success and league progress
In 1921 Thistle won the Scottish Cup, beating Rangers 1–0 in the final. Johnny Blair scored the only goal of the game, which was held at Celtic Park. The Jags reached the final again nine years later, facing the same opposition, but Rangers won 2–1 in a replay following a 0–0 draw in the first match. In 1935 the Jags won both the Glasgow Cup and the Charity Cup, competitions that were taken seriously at the time.

Although it was over 30 years before Thistle achieved further cup success they not only maintained their top tier status during this period but finished third in the league in 1947–48, 1953–54 and 1962–63.
On 23 October 1971 Davie McParland's team secured the club's most famous result against Jock Stein's Celtic in the League Cup final at Hampden Park, Glasgow. 62,470 fans watched Thistle take a dramatic 4–0 lead at half time with goals from Alex Rae, Bobby Lawrie and Jimmy Bone amongst the many emerging talents in the Thistle squad including Alan Rough, Alex Forsyth and Denis McQuade. Kenny Dalglish pulled a goal back for Celtic, however the final result was never in doubt as Thistle eased to a 4–1 victory. Ironically before the match, former BBC sport broadcaster Sam Leitch stated that "In Scotland, it's League Cup final day at Hampden Park, where Celtic meet Partick Thistle, who have no chance."

Decline and "Save the Jags" campaign
Thistle's fortunes on the pitch declined during the 1980s. Although the club had experienced difficult times before, having dropped into the second tier of Scottish football twice in the 1970s, they had bounced straight back up on both occasions. The relegation of 1982 led to the club's first sustained period outside the top tier since the late 19th century. Between 1986 and 1989, Thistle were owned by Ken Bates, chairman of Chelsea, whose intention was to use Thistle as a feeder club for the English team; however few players moved between the clubs during those years, which were also unsuccessful on the field (they finished 8th in the second tier for five seasons running between 1985–86 and 1989–90).

Although this period of exile ended with promotion in 1992, mounting financial problems, including a debt of over £1.5 million, threatened to put the club out of existence. In 1998 in particular the club was close to going bankrupt and was only kept afloat by the fan-organised "Save the Jags" campaign. Despite avoiding financial oblivion Thistle were relegated to the third tier of Scottish Football in 1997–98 and only narrowly avoided a further relegation the following season, finishing in eighth place.

Revival under John Lambie

In 1999 John Lambie commenced his third period as manager of the club and under his stewardship Thistle enjoyed a brief revival, winning back-to-back promotions in 2000–01 and 2001–02, the second of which earned the club a place in the Scottish Premier League. SPL guidelines at the time stipulated that clubs would only be eligible for promotion to the league if their stadium had a minimum 10,000 seated capacity. To comply with these guidelines the terraced section at the north end of Firhill was replaced with a 2000-seat stand. Speaking in 2004, Thistle chairman Tom Hughes argued the club did not at the time require a stadium with such a large capacity and building the new stand 'seriously affected [their] competitiveness'. Thistle maintained their place in the SPL under Lambie by finishing 10th in 2002–03, despite being favourites for relegation.

Successive relegations and play-off promotion
Following Lambie's retirement at the end of the 2002–03 season, Thistle struggled. Gerry Collins (Lambie's previous assistant) was sacked mid-season and replaced with joint player-managers Derek Whyte and Gerry Britton. This change was not enough to revive the team, and Thistle were relegated at the end of the 2003–04 season after Inverness, having won the First Division title, were permitted to groundshare with Aberdeen. In season 2004–05 the team continued to struggle and Whyte and Britton were dismissed mid-season. Dick Campbell, their successor, was unable to avoid relegation to the Second Division. He did return the club to the First Division the following season, through the newly introduced play-off system, having finished 4th in the league. This brought to a close the club's most unpredictable decade, in footballing terms at least: between 1996 and 2006 Thistle had been promoted three times and relegated four times. They were the second team in Scottish football to be relegated from the top flight through successive subsequent relegations, excluding those caused by league reconstruction, after St. Johnstone in the 1980s.

Ian McCall's first tenure (2007–2011)

Despite starting well upon returning to the First Division, Dick Campbell was sacked on 27 March 2007, following a succession of poor results. A caretaker management team of Jimmy Bone and Terry Butcher saw out the season before Ian McCall, a former player, was unveiled as manager. McCall's first season saw Thistle finish 6th in the First Division and embark on a successful Scottish Cup campaign, reaching the quarter-finals before being defeated by eventual winners Rangers after a 1–1 draw at Ibrox, Thistle lost the replay 2–0 at Firhill. League form further improved in season 2008–09 with Thistle exceeding expectations to finish 2nd in the First Division, behind St Johnstone. This season saw midfielder Gary Harkins win the Irn Bru Phenomenal Player of the Year and Northern Ireland's Jonny Tuffey become the club's first full international for several years.

McCall quit his post as manager in April 2011, citing personal reasons. Jackie McNamara was initially appointed as caretaker manager before being made full-time manager of the club at the end of the 2010–11 season.

Jackie McNamara (2011–2013)
McNamara and assistant Simon Donnelly guided Thistle to a sixth-place finish in 2011–12 season. The following season Thistle started well and emerged as promotion candidates, competing with Dunfermline and Greenock Morton for a place in the following season's top flight. On 29 January 2013 the club gave permission to Dundee United to speak to McNamara about becoming their new manager. The following day McNamara and his assistant Simon Donnelly resigned, to become the new management team at United. Along with Donnelly, Jackie McNamara brought goalkeeper Craig Hinchliffe, Paul Paton and Chris Erskine to Tannadice. Thistle were second in the league at the time and, because McNamara was under contract, compensation was owed to the club.

Archibald era and the Scottish Premiership (2013–2018)

On 30 January 2013, Alan Archibald was appointed as the club's interim manager, with former Thistle player Scott Paterson as his assistant. On 22 March, the duo were given the job on a permanent basis signing a one-year rolling contract. The following month on 20 April 2013, the club clinched promotion to the Scottish Premiership having sealed the First Division championship with a 2–0 victory away to Falkirk. The title win meant Thistle returned to the top flight of Scottish football for the first time in nine years. The team also lost the Scottish Challenge Cup final to Queen of the South on penalties in April 2013.

Thistle's initial return to the Premiership had mixed success. The team managed to maintain a relatively positive away record, however it was months before Thistle finally secured a home win, with them beating Aberdeen 3–1 at Firhill in February 2014. Thistle managed to avoid the relegation and play-off spots, eventually finishing third-bottom, following a 4–2 win away to Hearts at Tynecastle. Thistle announced the club were completely free of debt in November 2015.

The 2015–16 Scottish Premiership season saw Thistle secure long-term contracts for many of their key players, including Kris Doolan, Callum Booth, Tomáš Černý and Mustapha Dumbuya.

On 7 May 2016, Thistle secured their Premiership status with a 2–0 away victory to Kilmarnock, with goals coming from Steven Lawless and Kris Doolan. This result meant that Archibald overtook former manager Davie McParland as the record holder of top-flight victories. On 8 April 2017, Thistle beat Motherwell 1–0 to secure a place in the top six for the first time since the league split was first introduced to the Scottish top flight in 2000–01.

In the 2017–18 Scottish Premiership, Thistle finished in 11th position, narrowly avoiding 12th place with Ross County being automatically relegated. Thistle subsequently went into the Scottish Premiership play-offs against Livingston, who had finished second in the Scottish Championship in their first season of returning to the league. On 17 May 2018, Thistle lost the first leg 2–1 away at Almondvale Stadium, with Kris Doolan getting Thistle's goal. Livingston then came to face Thistle at Firhill on 20 May 2018. Livingston won the away leg 0–1 after Keaghan Jacobs scored in the 46th minute. Thistle were relegated to the Scottish Championship after a stay in the top flight of five years. Subsequently, speculation surrounded whether or not Archibald would remain as Thistle's manager. On 24 May, Thistle announced on their website Archibald would remain as Partick Thistle's manager going into the Championship next season. As a result of Thistle's poor season, a number of players were not offered a new contract by the club including captain Abdul Osman, Callum Booth, Steven Lawless, Mustapha Dumbuya, Paul McGinn and Ryan Scully. Transfer listed players were Adam Barton, Niall Keown and Miles Storey. Australian midfielder Ryan Edwards triggered a relegation contract clause, allowing him to leave the club immediately. After a poor start to their 2018–19 Scottish Championship season, Archibald was sacked as manager on 6 October 2018 following a 2–0 loss to Ross County, leaving Thistle 8th in the Championship.

Gary Caldwell (2018–2019) 

On 15 October 2018, Thistle announced that former Celtic and Scotland international Gary Caldwell had been appointed as Archibald's replacement. Chairman Jacqui Low said "Put simply, he plans to build a strong defence that allows us to then push forward and play attacking football."

Thistle's first season in the Scottish Championship after relegation was a difficult one; the club were one of the promotion favourites but after a poor first half of the season they were sitting bottom by December and facing the possibility of back to back relegations. Caldwell performed a large squad overhaul in January including the key signing of Scott McDonald who went on to score 7 goals in 13 games. Caldwell managed to turn the season around with the club finishing in 6th position and avoiding further relegation to League One with a 3–0 away win to Queen of the South thus removing the threat of the relegation play-offs. Although safe, Caldwell released striker Kris Doolan who ended his decade-long stay at the club after being informed that his contract would not be renewed. Other players to depart included Miles Storey, Scott McDonald, Niall Keown and Souleymane Coulibaly.

From June 2019 and during the run up to the start of the 2019–20 season, a consortium led by Chinese American billionaire Chien Lee and American businessman Paul Conway looked to buy Partick Thistle, with talks going on throughout the beginning of the season. Partick Thistle Trust, a supporters group and the single biggest shareholder at the time with 19.28% of the club, released a statement urging shareholders not to support the potential takeover bid. By November, the takeover had not taken place.

Thistle made another poor start to the Championship season, picking up two points in the opening five games. Following a 1–1 draw away to Arbroath, Caldwell was sacked as manager.

Ian McCall return (2019–2023) and club takeover

After the sacking of Caldwell, Partick Thistle appointed Ayr United boss Ian McCall as their manager on the 23rd of September 2019.

On 21 November, Colin Weir completed the takeover of Partick Thistle, instead of the consortium led by Chien Lee and Paul Conway.  Weir purchased a majority shareholding and a holding in land at Firhill, Weir then immediately gave the land back to the club.  Weir's takeover included the plan to gift the shares of the club back to the fans, to ensure Partick Thistle became a fan owned club, with a Working Group of The PTFC Trust and Thistle Forever plus an interim board overseeing the transfer of shares.  After Weir's takeover the club announced that the plans for Partick Thistle's own training ground were to be shelved with the focus instead on completing the takeover and transfer of shares to the fans. In December 2019, majority shareholder and lifelong Jags fan Weir died at the age of 71.

McCall made several changes during the January 2020 transfer window, including bringing in the likes of Brian Graham, Zak Rudden and Darren Brownlie, with veteran striker Kenny Miller among those leaving, but Thistle continued to struggle. Thistle were knocked out of the Scottish Cup in a 2–1 home defeat against Celtic, and later lost in the Scottish Challenge Cup semi final to League One side Raith Rovers.

Scottish football was stopped in March 2020 due to the COVID-19 pandemic, at which time Thistle were in last place in the Championship (two points behind 9th place Queen of the South, although Thistle had a game in hand). A vote was subsequently taken to curtail the Championship, League One and League Two seasons, which meant that Thistle were relegated to League One. After talks of league reconstruction (which would have prevented Thistle being relegated) fell through, and following an anonymous donation, Thistle joined a legal action by Heart of Midlothian (who were relegated from the Scottish Premiership) against the SPFL. After a hearing at the Court of Session, a Scottish Football Association arbitration panel ruled that the SPFL had acted within its powers and therefore confirmed the relegations of Hearts and Thistle, meaning Thistle had now been relegated twice in the space of three seasons, dropping from the Premiership to League One.

The 2020–21 Scottish League One season was a stop-start affair due to COVID-19 and shutdown mid-season for a number of months before restarting in March, with the clubs agreeing to a further reduced 22 game season rather than the 27 game season originally planned. After a mixed first half of the campaign in League One, Thistle went on a fantastic run of form in April, winning six games and drawing two, as they secured the 2020–21 Scottish League One title on 29 April 2021 after defeating Falkirk 5–0 (their first trophy for eight years) and promotion back to the Scottish Championship at the first time of asking. Thistle manager Ian McCall described the title win as the most satisfying of his career.

On their return to the Championship Thistle finished 4th in the league securing a promotion play-off place. Thistle lost 3–1 on aggregate to eventual finalists Inverness in the Premiership to end the 2021–22 season.

Thistle made a good start to the 2022–23 season, sitting top of the Championship after the first 10 games. However, a poor run of form followed. Despite picking up slightly in later weeks, following back to back home defeats to Hamilton Academical and Cove Rangers and a 3-2 defeat to Rangers at Ibrox in the Scottish cup, manager Ian McCall and assistants Alan Archibald and Neil Scally were sacked with Thistle sitting 5th in the Championship table. It was also confirmed former player and hall of famer Kris Doolan had been appointed interim manager.

Kris Doolan era (2023– )
After the departure of McCall it was announced that former player and club hall of famer Kris Doolan would take over as interim manager with Paul MacDonald as his assistant.
After winning twice away at Ayr United and Dundee and a goalless draw with Arbroath as interim, Doolan was appointed permanent manager of Thistle on 3 March 2023. In Doolan's first game as permanent manager, he guided Thistle to a 3–0 home win over Raith Rovers.

Club crest and colours

The first crest to appear on a Partick Thistle kit was a thistle design, and every logo since has featured a thistle. The thistle appeared first in 1902, then again in 1909. It remained until 1978, when a new logo with the thistle housed inside a roundel was used. A modernist logo with the thistle on a rectangle was introduced in 1990, and the current crest was introduced in 2008.

The Jags flirted with a number of colour schemes in their early years. From their inception until 1900 the kits were predominantly blue with red and white trimmings. There was then a brief period in which the players wore an orange and black striped top with white shorts and black socks. This was replaced in 1905 by a colour scheme close to that used by Aston Villa, before the club reverted to the predominantly blue kits in 1909. In season 1936–37 they changed to, and settled upon, the red-yellow-and-black attire for which they are best known, this change having been triggered initially by the club borrowing kits from the local rugby union team, West of Scotland Football Club.

In 2008–09 and 2009–10, Thistle became the first football club in Scotland to use pink as the primary colour in their away kit. In 2008–09 this took the form of silver- and pink-hooped tops.

During the 2014–15 season, Partick Thistle supported the Breast Cancer Care Charity by wearing a black and pink away shirt, with the charity ribbon on the shirt. The partnership saw a portion of kit sale revenue being donated to Breast Cancer Care.

For the 2019–20 season, Partick Thistle released their new away kit which featured a Rainbow flag design under the sleeves to show support for the LGBT movement. By doing so, they became the first Scottish club to incorporate the flag on a football jersey. Club executive Gerry Britton said: "We are really pleased with how the strips look and hope the supporters will like them as much as we do. We were very clear when putting together the design, that we wanted to make a statement about inclusivity and that’s what inspired the rainbow feature on the away shirt."

Stadium

Before moving to the Maryhill area in 1909, Partick Thistle hosted their home games over numerous sites in and around Glasgow including Kelvingrove Park, Jordanvale Park and Muir Park. In 1897, the club moved to Meadowside, near the River Clyde. However, in 1908 Thistle were forced to vacate the area to make way for a new shipyard.

After playing at numerous other grounds in Glasgow, Greenock, Port Glasgow, Kilmarnock, Edinburgh and even Aberdeen for over a season, Partick Thistle moved to their present home, Firhill Stadium, in 1909, when they purchased some spare Caledonian Railway land in Maryhill for £5,500. The stadium consists of three stands: the Main Stand which was built in 1927 and can seat around 2,900 supporters; the Jackie Husband Stand, which was built in 1994 and has a capacity of approximately 6,500; and the North Stand, renamed the John Lambie Stand in 2018 in tribute to the legendary club manager who died that year, which can house around 2,000 supporters. On the south side of the stadium there is a grass embankment, known to home fans as "The Bing", which had been open terracing until this was demolished in 2006 due to the stand failing to meet the criteria of Scottish Football Association safety regulations. There have been various plans to redevelop the south end of the stadium but thus far none have come to fruition.

Firhill has been used by other football teams and for rugby over the years. Between 1986 and 1991 Clyde ground shared with Thistle, following their eviction from Shawfield. Hamilton Academical also ground shared for two spells over seven years, following them being forced out of Douglas Park in 1994. In December 2005, Firhill also became the home of Glasgow's professional rugby union team, Glasgow Warriors, when they moved from their previous base at Hughenden. After returning to Hughenden in 2006, the Warriors took up a two-year residency at Firhill from the start of the 2007–08 Celtic League season. This was extended in April 2009 for a further five years. Glasgow Warriors left Firhill after the 2011–12 season and moved to Scotstoun Stadium. During the 2012–13 season the ground was also used by Celtic's under-20 squad as their home ground, but following Thistle's promotion this stopped for the 2013–14 season.

During the 2013–14 season, the Main Stand was re-opened to seat the high number of away supporters. In one instance, the North Stand was used for Celtic supporters as fears grew over fire dangers. During early June 2016 the Main Stand was renamed The Colin Weir Stand in honour of Colin Weir who was made the first ever patron of Partick Thistle after making numerous donations to the club's youth system, the Thistle Weir Academy.

On the Glasgow Subway network, Kelvinbridge and St George's Cross are within 15 minutes walk of the stadium.

Training facilities
For many years, Thistle struggled to find a permanent training ground at which to base themselves. Subsequently, the club relied on independently owned facilities that usually restricted Thistle's ability to train freely.

As of 2014, the club trained at the University of Glasgow's Garscube Sports Complex on the northern periphery of the city (near Bearsden, East Dunbartonshire).

Thistle's fortunes improved however in April 2017, the month they secured their top-six Premiership status. Millionaire couple Colin and Christine Weir invested in the club again, allowing plans for a new £4 million purpose-built training centre for the club to use as a permanent base.  Thistle expected to lease this from the Weirs' company Three Black Cats.

In July 2018, it was announced that the new training facility would be named after Thistle's 1971 Scottish League Cup Final manager Davie McParland, who died just days after the announcement was made. The new facility was to be located near the town Kirkintilloch. Plans for the new facility were abandoned in December 2019 as the investment money was instead used by Colin Weir to purchase the club and to operate a fan-owned business model. A short time after this announcement, Weir died at the age of 71.

In preparation for the 2020–21 Scottish League One season, Thistle trained at Burnbrae Stadium in Milngavie, which is the home of rugby union club West of Scotland FC.

Notable former players

All former players or managers listed have been inducted into either the Scottish Football Hall of Fame or Partick Thistle's own Hall of Fame. These include players who participated in both the 1921 Scottish Cup Final and the 1971 Scottish League Cup Final.

Scottish Hall of Fame
  Alan Hansen
  Mo Johnston
  Alan Rough

Club Hall of Fame
Partial list of those in the Club Hall of Fame.

  Andy Anderson
  Alan Archibald
  Kenny Arthur
  Bertie Auld
  Gerry Britton
  Chic Charnley
  Nobby Clark
  Kris Doolan
  Neil Duffy
  Chris Erskine
  John Harvey
  Bobby Houston
  Jackie Husband
  John Lambie
  Bobby Law
  Danny Lennon
  Peter McKennan
  Johnny MacKenzie
  Davie McParland
  Denis McQuade
  Alex O'Hara
  Alex Rae
  Doug Somner
  Kenny Watson

Club culture and fanbase

The club has a relatively modest fanbase which is mostly centred around Northern Glasgow, although they do have pockets of fans from across the globe. Being in close proximity to a large student population the club attracts many new fans from the local universities.

The club prides itself on being non-sectarian and, therefore, not involved in the Old Firm division.

Since the 1980s, the club has a small hooligan firm called the North Glasgow Express.

Rivalries
Although the club competes with neighbours Rangers and Celtic, due to the vast differences in team size and fortunes those rivalries are not reciprocated. The "Glasgow derby" is therefore contested with Clyde, sometimes dubbed the "Old Firm alternative".  One of the fiercest rivals were Airdrieonians with past violent clashes between fans including Airdrie's Section B group, however this rivalry has faded with time. Strong rivalries also existed with Clydebank due to the geographic proximity and controversial ownership in the past (with plans which almost saw both clubs bankrupt); and local rivals Kilmarnock.  The club has a more modern rivalry with Morton, which stemmed from the 2012–13 title race; Thistle won the First Division and Morton finished runners-up.

Chants and songs
Thistle fans sing songs during matches, some of which are relatively generic but others which are unique. Choruses of "He Wears Number 9", "Rellow Army", "Mary fae Maryhill", "Over Land and Sea", "Forever and Ever", "We've Followed the Thistle for Many a Day" (to the tune of Wild Rover), "Oh Maryhill is wonderful", "We’re a well known Glasgow Football Team", "Super Ian McCall", "We score when we want" and "Gerry Britton is the King of Spain" are commonly heard in the singing section of the home support, in the John Lambie stand.

Attendances

During their previous foray into the top flight of Scottish football in season 2002–03 attendances exceeded 6,000, whereas in the lower divisions they have tended to range between 2,000 and 4,000.

During the Jags' title winning campaign of 2012–13, a match of significant importance was played against Greenock Morton; the attendance was 8,875 which was the biggest First Division crowd that season.

On the day of their return to the top flight against Dundee United on 2 August 2013, the attendance at Firhill was 7,822. Average home attendances for Thistle's maiden season back in the Scottish Premiership was around 5,000, however the 2014–15 season saw a 25% drop with an average home crowd of 3,500.

Notable supporters
Mhairi Black, MP for Paisley & Renfrewshire South.
Maryhill born actor Robert Carlyle (Trainspotting, The Full Monty and The 51st State) is also a famous supporter, stating he would rather watch the Jags than watch Arsenal or Manchester United.
Craig Ferguson, former host of the popular American chat show The Late Late Show with Craig Ferguson.
Laura Kuenssberg, BBC Political editor.
The historian Niall Ferguson was a supporter while growing up in Glasgow.
Hollyoaks actor Chris Fountain.
American actor David Hasselhoff said he is a fan of the club, and likes the club's values. Mr Hasselhoff also met some of the team for a live TV interview.
Jack Revill, DJ from Glasgow better known as Jackmaster.
Former Labour leader Jeremy Corbyn was pictured wearing a Partick Thistle scarf on a train and has mentioned the club in the past.
Former Tennis player Colin Fleming is a self proclaimed Jags fan, following in his family's footsteps as he attended games when he was younger and kept track of Thistle's results while on tour.

Sponsors
The club's main sponsor is Just Employment Law, taking over from Kingsford Capital Management. MacB resumed sponsorship of Partick Thistle in the summer of 2012, and subsequently signed a two-year extension, keeping them as main sponsors until the end of the 2014–15 season. Scottish security system company Alarmfast also started sponsoring Thistle for the 2014–15 season.

Thistle's kit maker is Irish manufacturers O'Neills, having replaced Spanish company Joma at the start of the 2020–21 season.

Mascot

Partick Thistle's current mascot is a sun-shaped character named Kingsley, and was designed by the Turner Prize-nominated artist David Shrigley. Kingsley was unveiled on 22 June 2015 to coincide with Thistle's new sponsorship with California-based investment firm Kingsford Capital Management. Kingsley succeeded Jaggy MacBee, a bumble bee who had been the club's mascot from 2011 to 2015, as part of the club's sponsorship with Scottish beverage company MacB. Prior to that the mascot was a brightly-coloured toucan called Pee Tee.

Kingsley gained widespread notoriety online, having trended worldwide on Twitter, as well as being publicised by major networks such as CNN and The Washington Post, CNN and TIME Magazine. The launch, and subsequent pictures, appeared across the UK media including in The Daily Telegraph, The Times, BBC, Sky Sports, The Herald, and Talk Sport.

Partick Thistle's general manager Ian Maxwell hailed the success of Kingsley in drawing attention to the club, stating that the worldwide interest and TV coverage amounted to the "biggest amount of publicity from a sponsorship launch in Scottish football history". The Kingsley mascot has become a major source of merchandising potential for the club, with demand outstripping supply.

Community trust

Partick Thistle Women

Thistle Weir Ladies Football Club was officially founded as part of the Thistle Weir Academy in 2014, having previously existed as part of the Charitable Trust for one year prior to that.
In October 2018, the team gained promotion to the Scottish Women's Premier League 2 (SWPL 2), which is the second highest tier for women's football in Scotland. In January 2019, the club rebranded as Partick Thistle Women's Football Club.

The team train at the Firhill Complex in Maryhill, but play their matches at Petershill Park in Springburn.

Thistle Weir Youth Academy
In October 2013, millionaires and long time Thistle fans Chris and Colin Weir donated £750,000 to Partick Thistle to set up a new advanced youth academy. The academy was named the Thistle Weir Youth Academy. Graduates of the academy include James Penrice, Aidan Fitzpatrick, Jack Hendry and Kevin Nisbet.

Current squad

First-team squad

On loan

Club staff

Boardroom

Coaching and backroom staff

Source:

Managers

Individual achievements

Most appearances

All-time top goalscorers

Honours

Major

Scottish Cup:
Winners (1): 1920–21
Runners up (1): 1929–30
Scottish League Cup:
Winners (1): 1971–72
Runners up (3): 1953–54, 1956–57, 1958–59

Minor

Scottish Championship / Scottish Football League First Division, second tier:
Winners (6): 1896–97, 1899–1900, 1970–71, 1975–76, 2001–02, 2012–13
Runners up (3): 1901–02, 1991–92, 2008–09
Scottish League One / Scottish Football League Second Division, third tier:
Winners (2): 2000–01, 2020–21
Play-off Winners: 2005–06
Scottish Challenge Cup:
Runners up: 2012–13

Other

Glasgow Cup
Winners (7): 1934–35, 1950–51, 1952–53, 1954–55, 1960–61, 1980–81, 1988–89
Runners up (11): 1888–89, 1900–01, 1911–12, 1914–15, 1917–18, 1919–20, 1932–33, 1936–37, 1959–60, 1966–67, 1968–69

Glasgow Merchants Charity Cup
Winners (3): 1926–27, 1934–35, 1948–49
Runners up (7): 1904–05, 1915–16, 1917–18, 1940–41, 1950–51, 1955–56, 1959–60

Summer Cup: 1945
Glasgow Dental Hospital Cup: 1928

West of Scotland FA Cup: 1879

Yoker Cup: 1881, 1882, 1883

Partick Championship: 1884

Greenock Charity Cup: 1893

Paisley Charity Cup: 1936

British Cup-Winners' Challenge: 1921

Tennents' Sixes: 1993 (last winners)

 Coronation Cup: 1928, 1929

ARR Craib Cup: 2012

Club records
Highest record home attendance: 49,838 vs Rangers, Scottish First Division, 18 February 1922
Most league appearances: Alan Rough, 410
Most league goals in a season: Alex Hair, 41, 1926–27
Record defeat: 0–10 v Queen's Park, Scottish Cup, 3 December 1881
Record victory: 16–0 v Royal Albert, Scottish Cup 1st round, 17 January 1931
Record points total: 78, Scottish First Division, 2012–13
Record transfer fee paid: £85,000 to Celtic for Andy Murdoch, February 1991
Record transfer fee received: £350,000 from Barnsley for Liam Lindsay, June 2017 / £350,000 from Norwich City for Aidan Fitzpatrick, July 2019

European record

Thistle have participated in European competition on three different occasions. On the first occasion, they qualified having finished third in the First Division. They progressed to the second round of the Fairs Cup before being eliminated by Spartak Brno. They qualified for the UEFA Cup in 1972–73 after winning the League Cup the previous season; Hungarian side Honvéd eliminated them in the first round. Their most recent European campaign was the 1995 UEFA Intertoto Cup, when they finished 4th with four points in Group 6.

References

Sources

External links

 
 BBC Sport: Partick Thistle
 Evening Times: Partick Thistle
 Grasping the Thistle, 2002 BBC Scotland documentary

 
Football clubs in Scotland
Association football clubs established in 1876
Football clubs in Glasgow
1876 establishments in Scotland
Scottish Premier League teams
Scottish Football League teams
Scottish Cup winners
Scottish Professional Football League teams
Scottish League Cup winners
Partick
Maryhill
Fan-owned football clubs